NASCAR, originally an acronym for National Association of Stock Car Auto Racing, held its first season in 1949. NASCAR runs a number of racing series, including three nation-wide race divisions: the top level NASCAR Cup Series; the "minor league" proving ground NASCAR Xfinity Series; and the pickup truck racing of the NASCAR Camping World Truck Series.

The NASCAR championship seasons consist of a series of races held on purpose-built tracks. 
The results of each race are combined to determine two championships in each of the top series, one for drivers and one for manufacturers. The Drivers' Championship is awarded to each division's most successful NASCAR driver over a season, as determined by a points system, and has been awarded since the first NASCAR season in 1949. The Manufacturers' Championship is awarded to the each division's most successful NASCAR manufacturer over a season, also determined by a points system based on race results. The Manufacturers' Championship was first awarded in 1952.

Seasons
Note: In any given season, the overall Manufacturer's champion may not been the supplier to the overall Driver's champion.

Cup Series

Xfinity Series

Camping World Truck Series

References

List
Seasons